Cross Fire is a 1933 American pre-Code Western film starring Tom Keene. It made a profit of $26,000.

Cast 
 Tom Keene as Tom 'Jack' Allen
 Betty Furness as Pat 'Mike' Plummer
 Edgar Kennedy as Ed Wimpy
 Eddie Phillips as Bert King
 Stanley Blystone as Kreuger - Henchman
 Lafe McKee as Daniel Plummer
 Nick Cogley as Doc Milas P. Stiles
 Murdock MacQuarrie as Sheriff Jim Wells
 Tom Kennedy as French Bouncer

References

External links
Cross Fire at TCMDB
Cross Fire at IMDb

1933 films
Films directed by Otto Brower
American Western (genre) films
1933 Western (genre) films
American black-and-white films
1930s English-language films
1930s American films